In algebraic geometry, the Kempf–Ness theorem, introduced by , gives a criterion for the stability of a vector in a representation of a complex reductive group. If the complex vector space is given a norm that is invariant under a maximal compact subgroup of the reductive group, then the Kempf–Ness theorem states that a vector is stable if and only if the norm attains a minimum value on the orbit of the vector.

The theorem has the following consequence: If X is a complex smooth projective variety and if G is a reductive complex Lie group, then  (the GIT quotient of X by G) is homeomorphic to the symplectic quotient of X by a maximal compact subgroup of G.

References

Invariant theory
Theorems in algebraic geometry